The current Baltimore County State's Attorney is Scott D. Shellenberger.  Shellenberger took office on January 2, 2007.

Shellenberger started his legal career in the Baltimore County State's Attorney's Office working as a law clerk while attending the University of Baltimore Law School.  Upon being admitted to the bar in 1985, Shellenberger  began working as a prosecutor.

Shellenberger slowly moved through the ranks in the State's Attorney's Office.  In addition to trying cases, Shellenberger served as supervisor of the Felony Screening, Career Criminal and Automobile Manslaughter Units.

Shellenberger was born and raised in Baltimore County.  He is a graduate of Loch Raven High School, Loyola College and the University of Baltimore School of Law.  He resides with his wife and daughters in the same Baltimore County neighborhood where he grew up.

Shellenberger will serve a four-year term.

The office is responsible for prosecuting felony, misdemeanor and juvenile cases in Baltimore County, Maryland.

The office currently employs 58 attorneys to handle the case load in the District, Juvenile, and Circuit Courts of Baltimore County, Maryland.

Contact 
Baltimore County State's Attorney's Office
401 Bosley Avenue Rm. 511
Towson, Maryland  21204
Phone 410-887-6600

See also
 Allegheny County District Attorney
 Dallas County District Attorney
 Denver District Attorney's Office
 District Attorney of Philadelphia
 King County Prosecuting Attorney
 Los Angeles County District Attorney
 Milwaukee County District Attorney
 New York County District Attorney
 San Diego County District Attorney
 San Francisco District Attorney's Office

References

External links 

Baltimore County Government
Political Webpage

District attorneys in Maryland
Baltimore County, Maryland